Felsőszölnök ( . ) is a village in Vas County, Hungary. It is the westernmost point of Hungary, and lies on the borders with Slovenia and Austria.

Location
The nearest settlements are Oberdrosen in Jennersdorf, Burgenland to the northwest, and Neradnovci in the Municipality of Gornji Petrovci, Slovenia to the south.

Culture
The Alliance of Hungarian Slovenes has its seat in Felsőszölnök, there is a preschool with education in Slovene, and Slovene is taught in the primary school.

The Martinje-Felsőszölnök border crossing between Hungary and Slovenia was opened in 1992, resulting in more frequent contacts between the districts in the neighbouring countries.

Twin cities

Kuzma, Slovenia
Sankt Martin an der Raab, Austria

People
 András Horváth worked in Felsőszölnök.
 József Kossics died in Felsőszölnök.
 István Pintér

References

External links

 Felsőszölnök (in Hungarian)

Populated places in Vas County
Hungarian Slovenes